The flip-disc display (or flip-dot display) is an electromechanical dot matrix display technology used for large outdoor signs, normally those that will be exposed to direct sunlight. Flip-disc technology has been used for destination signs in buses across North America, Europe and Australia, as well as for variable-message signs on highways.  It has also been used extensively on public information displays.  A few game shows have also used flip-disc displays, including Canadian shows like Just Like Mom, The Joke's on Us and Uh Oh!, but most notably the American game show Family Feud from 1976 to 1995 and its British version Family Fortunes from 1980 to 2002. The Polish version of Family Feud, Familiada, still uses this board, which was bought from the Swedish version of the show. In 2012, Brooklyn-based artist studio, BREAKFAST, began engineering a modernized Flip-Disc technology which was eventually able to flip the discs at over 60 times per second.

Design
The flip-disc display consists of a grid of small metal discs that are black on one side and a bright color on the other (typically white or day-glo yellow), set into a black background. With power applied, the disc flips to show the other side. Once flipped, the discs will remain in position without power.

The disc is attached to an axle which also carries a small permanent magnet. Positioned close to the magnet is a solenoid. By pulsing the solenoid coil with the appropriate electrical polarity, the permanent magnet on the axle will align itself with the magnetic field, also turning the disc. Another style uses a magnet embedded in the disc itself, with separate solenoids arranged at the ends or side to flip it.

A computerized driver system reads data, typically characters, and flips the appropriate discs to produce the desired display. Some displays use the other end of the solenoid to actuate a reed switch, which controls an LED array behind the disc, resulting in a display that is visible at night but requires no extra drive electronics.

Various driving schemes are in use. Their basic purpose is to reduce the amount of wiring and electronics needed to drive the solenoids. All common methods connect the solenoids in some sort of matrix. One driving method is similar to that of core memory: the solenoids are connected in a simple matrix. Those solenoids at the crossing point of two powered wires are driven with enough current to flip their discs; those powered on only the vertical or horizontal line see only 1/2 of the required force (as flux is proportional to current, which in turn is proportional to the  voltage). Those on unpowered lines also do not flip.

Typically, the driving scheme works its way from top to bottom, powering each horizontal line "on" and then powering the needed vertical lines to set up that row. The whole process takes a few seconds, during which time the sound of the discs being flipped over is quite distinctive.

Other driving schemes use diodes to isolate non-driven solenoids, which allows only the discs whose state needs changing to be flipped. This uses less power and may be more robust.

History
The flip-disc display was developed by Kenyon Taylor at Ferranti-Packard at the request of Trans-Canada Air Lines (today's Air Canada). By the time the system had been patented in 1961, TCA had already lost interest and Ferranti's management didn't consider the project very interesting.

The first big opportunity for this system came in 1961 when the Montreal Stock Exchange decided to modernize its method of displaying trading information. Ferranti-Packard and Westinghouse both bid on the project, Westinghouse using an electro-luminescent technology. Ferranti won the contract after demonstrating the system with a mock-up they built in a disused warehouse across the street from the exchange's new offices, using hand-painted dots moved by hand to show how the system would work. The dots were slowly replaced with operating modules as they became available. The $700,000 system was beset by delays and technical problems, but once it became fully operational it was considered very reliable.

The systems were relatively expensive because of their manual construction, typically completed by women who "sewed" the displays in a fashion very similar to the construction of magnetic-core memory. Worse, Ferranti signed maintenance contracts that were, by 1971, losing $12,000 a month. A re-organization of the engineering and maintenance department addressed the problems, and prices started to fall. By 1977 the system had won sales with half the world's major stock exchanges.

As prices fell, they were soon found in wider roles, notably that of highway signs and information systems for public transport. In Europe and in the United States, vane displays based on the same technology became popular for displaying prices at gasoline stations. In 1974 Ferranti started a project to build smaller versions for the front of buses and trains, and by 1977 revenue from these had already surpassed that from other lines of business. The displays often required minor maintenance to free up "stuck" discs.

Alternative technologies

Flip-disc systems are still widespread but are not often found in new installations. Their place has been filled by LED-based products, which use a small amount of power constantly rather than each time the message changes, but are easily visible in light and darkness and, having no moving parts, require little maintenance.

Some producers offer combined displays that use flip-dot and LED technologies together (every dot-disc has its own LED) and thereby they combine their advantages. For example, the Czech company BUSE from Blansko supplies self-patented DOT-LED displays (only DOT and only LED as well) in Central and East Europe. This combined technology was used for outside displays of most of new buses and trams.

Application

See also
 History of display technology
 Vane display, a display using a similar mechanism but configured as a 7-segment display
 Digital micromirror device

References

External links

 

Display technology
Ferranti
Computer-related introductions in 1961